Mullaitivu Maha Vidyalayam ( Mullaittīvu Makā Vittiyālayam) is a provincial school in Mullaitivu, Sri Lanka. School girls studying in this school were among those killed in the Chencholai bombing.

See also
 List of schools in Northern Province, Sri Lanka

References

External links
 Mullaitivu Maha Vidyalayam

Provincial schools in Sri Lanka
Buildings and structures in Mullaitivu
Schools in Mullaitivu District